Target Earth is a 1954 independently made American black-and-white science fiction film, produced by Herman Cohen, directed by Sherman A. Rose, that stars Richard Denning, Kathleen Crowley, Virginia Grey, and Whit Bissell. The film was distributed by Allied Artists Pictures Corporation.

Set in a deserted Chicago, the film's storyline follows a small group of people overlooked during a mass evacuation of "the Windy City", carried out because of a sudden invasion by hostile robotic beings believed to be from the planet Venus.

Plot

After a failed attempt at suicide, Nora King regains consciousness and discovers that her building has no electricity or water, and so she wanders out into the empty, quiet streets of Chicago. Stumbling over the body of a dead woman, she encounters Frank Brooks, who has just recently revived after being beaten unconscious in a robbery.

The two of them try to find others in the deserted city. Hearing music coming from a nearby restaurant, they come upon a couple, Jim Wilson and Vicki Harris, who are still drunk. They tell them they were incapable of joining the evacuation of Chicago's population that took place. Now proceeding together as a group, they continue to search the deserted streets, coming upon a car that will not start. Another survivor, Charles Otis, sees them and tells them that the same applies to all the other cars he has tried.

A growing apprehension takes hold as they begin to appreciate that they are alone and must face an unknown menace which has caused everyone to evacuate. Charles finds a newspaper in a hotel lobby that proclaims that a "mystery army" is attacking the city. In a panic, he runs outside and is killed by a death ray emitted from an alien robot standing in the street.

While attempting to defend the city, a military force, led by Lt. Gen. Wood, sets up a command post. After Air Force bombers are destroyed by the advancing invaders, the use of atomic weapons is considered as an option. A group of scientists, including their chief research scientist, are finally able to work on a captured robot to discover if the alien machines have any vulnerabilities.

While trying to escape the attacking robots, the small band is joined by Davis, a psychotic killer who has his own plans for survival. The survivors quickly realize they have an enemy within their group, as well as the one from outer space. Several deaths occur as they flee from the alien menace. An army unit eventually arrives that is now fully equipped with a sonic weapon that effectively dispatches the invading robots, halting their invasion.

Cast

 Richard Denning as Frank Brooks
 Kathleen Crowley as Nora King
 Virginia Grey as Vicki Harris
 Richard Reeves as Jim Wilson
 Robert Roark as Davis
 Whit Bissell as Tom, Chief research scientist
 Arthur Space as Lt. General Wood
 Steve Pendleton as Colonel
 Mort Marshall as Charles Otis
 House Peters Jr. as Technician
 Steve Calvert as the Robot

Production
The screenplay for Target Earth is based on the 1953 science fiction short story "Deadly City" by Paul W. Fairman, which first appeared in the March 1953 issue of If magazine under Fairman's pseudonym, "Ivar Jorgensen".

Principal photography began mid-July 1954 at Kling Studios, for a shooting schedule of a tight seven days that also included outdoor shooting. While the story is set in Chicago, Target Earth was actually filmed in Los Angeles. Empty street scenes were filmed during early morning hours before normal traffic began.

Casting
Actor Robert Roark was given a role because his father was a large investor in Target Earth.

Even though a "robot army" is mentioned several times during the film, only one robot was constructed for the production, which was then used in all scenes to depict the invasion. When actor Steve Calvert, who played the robot, was not working on B films, he regularly worked as a bartender at Ciro's on the Sunset Strip. He also played the apes in Bride of the Gorilla (1951) and Bela Lugosi Meets a Brooklyn Gorilla (1952).

Reception
Target Earth was a typical product of 1950s-filmed science fiction but could never rise above its low budget underpinnings. One of the few notable aspects of the production was that the film was one of the first to explore the subgenre of alien invasions, following the success of George Pal's The War of the Worlds (1953) and William Cameron Menzies' Invaders from Mars (1953). Target Earth was also produced by Herman Cohen, making his producing debut, who would become one of the most prominent B movie producers of the 1960s. Director Sherman A. Rose, who was a prolific editor in both television and film, would go on to make only two other films.

TV Guide later rated the film 1/4 stars, writing, "The robots are just plain disappointing". David Maine of PopMatters rated it 6/10 stars and called it "a tight, engaging little thriller that focuses more on character than special effects".

References

Notes

Citations

Bibliography

 Walker, John, ed. Halliwell's Who's Who in the Movies (14th ed.). New York: HarperResource, 1997. .
 Warren, Bill. Keep Watching The Skies, American Science Fiction Movies of the Fifties, Vol I: 1950–1957. Jefferson, North Carolina: McFarland & Company, 1982. .
 Weaver, Tom. "Herman Cohen Interview". Attack of the Monster Movie Makers: Interviews With 20 Genre Giants. Jefferson, North Carolina: McFarland & Company, 1994. .

External links

 
 
 

1953 films
1950s science fiction films
American science fiction films
Venus in film
Allied Artists films
Films scored by Paul Dunlap
American black-and-white films
1950s English-language films
1950s American films
Films based on science fiction short stories